The 1979 Kentucky gubernatorial election was held on November 6, 1979. Democratic nominee John Y. Brown Jr. defeated Republican nominee Louie Nunn with 59.41% of the vote.

Primary elections
Primary elections were held on May 29, 1979.

Democratic primary

Candidates
John Y. Brown Jr., businessman
Harvey I. Sloane, former Mayor of Louisville
Terry McBrayer, former State Representative
Carroll Hubbard, U.S. Representative
Thelma Stovall, incumbent Lieutenant Governor
Lyle L. Willis
George Atkins, Kentucky State Auditor
Doris Shuja Binion
John J. Weikel

Results

Republican primary

Candidates
Louie Nunn, former Governor
Ray B. White
Elmer Begley Jr.
Thurman Jerome Hamlin

Results

General election

Candidates
John Y. Brown Jr., Democratic
Louie Nunn, Republican

Results

References

1979
Kentucky
Governor